Blipfoto is an Edinburgh-headquartered online daily photo journal and social networking service allowing people to save a record of their life in pictures; sharing their photographs and telling their stories one day at a time. It has a positive ‘Be Excellent’ ethos. 

With over 18 million page views a month, the site has a strict rule allowing its users to post just one picture a day to their journal. To date, 'Blippers' in over 170 countries worldwide have posted 3.4 million photos with close to 22 million shared comments on the site. Each photo on Blipfoto represents a single day in someone's life - so there are almost 3.5m individual days saved to date.

History

In October 2004, Blipfoto founder Joe Tree built a website which let him publish just one photo a day on the internet and write something about it. He set two simple rules: he could only upload one picture a day, and it had to be taken on that day.

In the summer of 2006, Tree released a very rudimentary version of Blipfoto and invited 15 other people to join in. It let anyone set up a journal of their own, upload one picture a day, write some words, and comment on other people’s material. This was subsequently opened to anyone.

In November 2009 the site won a BAFTA Scotland award for the best website.

Following the BAFTA win, in December 2010 Blipfoto announced seed investment which allowed the business to turn from a project into a full-time venture.

In 2011 it was voted as best Scottish website by arts and culture magazine The List.

Blipfoto also worked in partnership with a number of large organisations on photographic projects and competitions. It premiered a film – life.turns - at the Edinburgh Art Festival in 2010. The stop motion film was created using 1205 photographs taken in 21 countries over 40 days.

This was the inspiration behind Scotland The World Over, a collaboration with Scotland.org. The film centred on the Scottish saltire flag, showing people in 32 countries around the world holding it. The film was compiled between St. Andrew's Day 2011 and Burns Night 2012.

In January 2015 Blipfoto went into partnership with Polaroid and the website was rebranded and relaunched as Polaroid Blipfoto.

In March 2015 Polaroid Blipfoto went into liquidation. Business services firm FRP Advisory were appointed as liquidators of the Edinburgh-based firm on 11 March. 

In February 2016 a new community owned company, Blipfuture CIC, completed purchase of the blipfoto website after raising over £130,000 in a crowdfunding campaign.  Blipfuture CIC will run the website for the benefit of its community, supported by volunteers.

Notable users

Mike Russell MSP
Steve Wozniak
Roseanna Cunningham MSP
Peter May
Janice Hally
Corrie Corfield

References

External links

ChatWise Website

Internet properties established in 2004
British social networking websites